Medzev, also known as Metzenseifen (particularly to Americans and the native German-speaking community) is a town and large municipality in Košice-okolie District in the Košice Region of eastern Slovakia. It is one of several towns in Bodva Valley. Other towns in Bodva Valley include: Jasov, Lucia Bania, Vyšný Medzev (Upper Metzenseifen), and Stos. Historically, It belonged to one of the original mountain towns in the Lower Zips/Dolný Spis: Gelnica/Göllnitz, Smolník/Schmöllnitz, Nálepkovo/Wagendrüssel, Krompachy/Krompach, Mníšek nad Hnilcom/Einsiedel, Švedlár/Schwedler.

History

The first settlement
Any official documents regarding the founding of Metzenseifen have yet to be found and were likely destroyed in the Counter-Reformation. Much of the historical records obtained regarding the history of Medzev come from the monastery in Jasov. As shown in the timeline, the departure of the Mongols in 1241 prompted King Béla IV to rebuild Hungary as quickly as possible. It is known that he invited Germans as part of his recolonization effort. Whether he directly invited the particular settlers of Metzenseifen remains unknown, but possible. The first official document from the Bodva Valley is that of a legal document from 1272, which describes the litigation of forestry rights between Vyšný Medzev / Upper Metzenseifen and Jasov. It could be extrapolated that Metzenseifen was founded sometime between 1241 and 1272.

The Little Village "Das Dörfl"
 Until now, any documents that would have been submitted to Vienna or Budapest regarding Medzev's specific date of establishment have not been found. Therefore, we must draw information from reliable sources in the timeline like demarcation, into which the colonists would have entered upon arriving in the area called Metzenseifen. The timeline, as well as official documents and historical data were wiped out by the end of the Counter-Reformation. The monastery in Jasov and the neighboring townships could help us via documents, in which the name "Metzenseifen" was mentioned.

The original settlers
The town was founded by ethnic Germans. It is safe to assume that they had a good reason to leave home and form this new settlement. The Feudal Age of the thirteenth century was less than satisfactory. It is known that certain privileges (e.g. freedom from servitude, etc.) were promised in order to persuade people to come to Slovakia (part of Upper Hungary).
Unfortunately, it is not yet known exactly where the origins of the German settlers originated. It was not common to register migrants in the 13th century. However, comparative research in dialectology may one day identify the origins.

The Germans of Metzenseifen belong to the Zipser Germans (see Zipser German Party), which is named after the Zips Mountains called Spiš in Slovak. The Zips are a smaller group of mountains that are included in the Carpathian Mountain Range, which is why they are also known as Karpatendeutscher 'Carpathian Germans'.

Timeline of earliest known events

Summary
In historical records the town was first mentioned in 1359. It was founded and settled by ethnic Germans.

The modern town stems from the merging of Nižný Medzev (German: Untermetzenseifen/Nider Metzenseifen/Nider Metzenseiffen/Nieder Mäzenseuffen/Nieder Metzenseif/Unter Mäznsüffen/ Unnter Metzensyffen) (Hungarian: Alsómeczenzéf) and Vyšný Medzev (German: Obermetzenseifen/Ober Metzenseuf; again independent since 1999) in 1960. The earliest known record of the town Metzenseifen comes from 1359 Mechenseuph. There were most likely German and Slovakian miners living together at that time, although Hungarian records show that the area was mostly uninhabited before King Bela IV invited Germans into the area. After the Mongolian invasion, there was a strong surge of German families. The ownership ratio between the two ethnic groups was assigned by the Jasov Monastery. Church and town records from as far back as the mid 1400s do not show any evidence of Slovak families in the town.

Mining in the mountain continued to increase throughout  and after the 14th century, as well as handcraft. After the 15th century, Medzev/Meztenseifen split between /Nižný/Unter-/Lower and Vyšný/Ober/Upper Medzev/Metzenseifen. During the Reformation, the monastery was closed and its governance discontinued. The struggle for power continued throughout the Counter-Reformation and eventually resulted in the rebuilding of the  monastery under the supervision of Maria Theresia, the Habsburg Archduchess of Austria and Queen of Hungary and Croatia.

Over the course of the industrialization period, Medzev/Metzenseifen became an economic center (site of many well-paid blacksmiths [approximately 100], who created agricultural tools). This led to tension in the 1930s between German and Slovakian speakers in the workplace. Before 1920 when Hungary was partitioned due to pressure by the Czechs and Slovaks, after forcing Hungary to sign the Treaty of Trianon,  German was the official language of the town, and ethnically 95% German. After 1920, some Slovaks moved into the town but the town was still predominately German. Until the end of World War II, the German population significantly outnumbered the Slovakian population. After World War II, teaching German in the town was forbidden, some Germans were killed, others expelled, and those who remained have assimilated. Germans were looked down upon, their children were forcibly educated in Slovak and a town which has been German for over 700 years has now been mostly obliterated. Although "official" records state that over 20% of the population speaks German, it's closer to 10% and the "Mantak" dialect of German the Merzenseifers spoke is only spoken now by a few dozen people.  In the past ten years, the number of Germans has increased by approximately 0.75%.

Panorama of the Bodva Valley

Geography
 The town lies at an elevation of 313 metres and covers an area of 31.861 km2. It has a population of about 3,800. It is located at the foothills of the Slovak Karst (south) and Volovec Mountains (north) on the Bodva River, around 35 km west of Košice.

People 

This village is primarily home to Slovaks, Germans, Hungarians, and Romani. Those people of Germanic origin refer to themselves as "Mantaks", although are more commonly recognized as Zipser Germans or Carpathian Germans.

Notable people  
 Theodor Kundtz was born on July 1, 1852 in Lower Metzenseifen. He traveled to the United States and became a millionaire in Cleveland, Ohio by making wooden furniture.
 Rudolf Schuster was the second president of Slovakia and came from a Carpathian German family from Medzev.

Demographics
According to the 2001 census, the town had 3,667 inhabitants. 75.43% of inhabitants were Slovaks, 13.55% Germans, 6.65% Roma, 1.55% Hungarians and 0.44% Czechs. The religious make-up was 77.58% Roman Catholics, 12.95% people with no religious affiliation, 2.18% Greek Catholics and 0.79% Lutherans. According to the 2011 census, the town has 4261 inhabitants.

Nationalities

Languages

Twin towns – sister cities

Medzev is a member of the Charter of European Rural Communities, a town twinning association across the European Union.

 Bienvenida, Spain
 Bièvre, Belgium
 Bucine, Italy
 Cashel, Ireland
 Cissé, France
 Desborough, England, United Kingdom
 Esch, Netherlands
 Hepstedt, Germany
 Ibănești, Romania
 Kandava, Latvia
 Kannus, Finland
 Kolindros, Greece
 Lassee, Austria
 Moravče, Slovenia
 Næstved, Denmark
 Nagycenk, Hungary
 Nadur, Malta
 Ockelbo, Sweden
 Pano Lefkara, Cyprus
 Põlva, Estonia
 Samuel (Soure), Portugal
 Slivo Pole, Bulgaria
 Starý Poddvorov, Czech Republic
 Strzyżów, Poland
 Tisno, Croatia
 Troisvierges, Luxembourg
 Žagarė, Lithuania

Other twin towns

 Castel Giorgio, Italy
 Holice, Czech Republic
 Miroslav, Czech Republic
 Rátka, Hungary

Notes

References 
 Kauer, J., Schürger, J. and Wagner, K. (1986). "Unter- und Ober-Metzenseifen Stoß Unterzips—Ostslowakei," Hilfsbund Karpatendeutscher Katholiken e.V., Arbeitskreis Bodwatal.

External links
Official website
Medzev/Metzenseifen Website
Karpatendeustscher Verein / Carpathian German Club

Cities and towns in Slovakia
Villages and municipalities in Košice-okolie District